Nikola Bjelanović (born 7 November 1997) is a Serbian football defender who plays for Lokomotiva Beograd.

Club career
Born in Raška, Bjelanović played for Bane Raška, Bežanija and Lokomotiva Beograd before he signed a three-year contract with Javor Ivanjica in last days of 2015, as the best right-back of the Serbian youth league and member of Serbia national under-19 football team. He made his Serbian SuperLiga debut for Javor Ivanjica in 35 fixture match of the 2015–16 season, against Metalac Gornji Milanovac, played on 7 May 2016. In summer 2016, Bjelanović moved on loan to FK IMT, where he collected 22 matches with 1 goal for 2016–17 season in the Serbian League Belgrade.

Career statistics

Club

References

External links
 

1997 births
Living people
People from Raška, Serbia
Association football defenders
Serbian footballers
FK Javor Ivanjica players
Serbian SuperLiga players